Still Alive is the second solo studio album by American hip hop producer DJ Mayonnaise. It was released on Anticon in 2007.

Critical reception

Stewart Mason of AllMusic gave the album 3.5 stars out of 5, saying, "DJ Mayonnaise does a fair job of keeping the potentially over-familiar arrangements and samples from coalescing into just another bit of negligible atmosphere for a boutique hotel bar near you, through unexpectedly tuneful melodies like 'Easily Distracted' and the album's one stylistic departure, the sneering Bush slam 'Strateegery.'" Lana Cooper of PopMatters commented that "Still Alive isn't a bad sophomore effort, but it's certainly not an epic masterwork that requires eight years in the making." She added, "While there are definite moments that shine, there are others that take a leap backwards or just stay floating somewhere in the middle."

On May 14, 2007, the album was included on XLR8Rs "Office Top Ten Album Picks" list.

Track listing

Personnel
Credits adapted from liner notes.

 DJ Mayonnaise – production
 Mike Ouellette – clarinet (3), tenor saxophone (4)
 Josh Thelin – alto saxophone (4, 7)
 Chris Gerrity – guitar (4)
 K-the-I??? – vocals (6)
 Tim Young – guitar (11)
 Mat "DJ RPM" Young – technical hand holding
 Agent 8 – mastering
 Chris Rossi – photography
 Sam Flax Keener – layout
 Baillie Parker – executive production

References

External links
 

2007 albums
Anticon albums
Hip hop albums by American artists
Instrumental hip hop albums